is a Japanese manga artist best known for the manga series Koume-chan ga Iku! (小梅ちゃんが行く!!, Here Comes Koume!!) which was adapted into a 12 episode anime series by the studio Gainax. Her works include short gag manga, story manga, yonkoma and essays.

Works
  (1993 Leed Publishing)
 (1993-1996 Takeshobo)
  (1994 Takeshobo)
  (1994 Takebosho)
 (1994 Tokuma Shoten)
 (1995 Bunkasha)
  (1995 Bunkasha)
  (1995 ASCII Media Works)
  (1996 Takeshobo)
  (1997 Shueisha)
 (1997 Shueisha)
  (1997 Futabasha)
  (1998 Shueisha) artist
  (2000 Bunkasha)
  (2000 Shueisha)
 (2000-2001 Takeshobo)
 (2001 Asuka Shinsha)
  (2001-2004 Shodensha)
 (2002–2004, serialized in Ultra Jump, Shueisha)
  (2007–2008, serialized in Manga Erotics F, Ohta Publishing)
  (2009, serialized in Manga Kurabu Original, Takeshobo)
  artist

References

External links

 Official page 

1969 births
Living people
People from Amagasaki
Manga artists from Hyōgo Prefecture